Provincial Route 1 is a highway located in the northeast province of Córdoba Province in Argentina. Provincial Route 1 develops from north to south, beginning its course on the border with the Santa Fe Province and ending in the surroundings of San Francisco, where it continues with National Route 158.

References

Provincial roads in Córdoba Province, Argentina